Emily Sue Savage-Rumbaugh (born August 16, 1946) is a psychologist and primatologist most known for her work with two bonobos, Kanzi and Panbanisha, investigating their linguistic and cognitive abilities using lexigrams and computer-based keyboards. Originally based at Georgia State University's Language Research Center in Atlanta, Georgia, she worked at the Iowa Primate Learning Sanctuary in Des Moines, Iowa from 2006 until her departure in November 2013. She currently sits on the Board of Directors of Bonobo Hope.

Early life, family and education

Savage-Rumbaugh earned her BA degree in psychology at Southwest Missouri State University in 1970. She earned her MS degree and her Ph.D. in psychology at the University of Oklahoma in 1975. She collaborates alongside her husband, renowned comparative psychologist Dr. Duane M. Rumbaugh, who was a pioneer in the study of ape language. She was asked how their study was influenced by living and working together while still at Georgia State University. "I don't think anyone could ever be accountable for as many apes as we have here if we weren't together. Duane and I reside immediately next to the research centre and are available 24 hours a day, 365 days a year. We go if an ape is sick, if one of the apes has escaped, or if Panbanisha is scared because the river is going to flood."

Career
Savage-Rumbaugh was a professor and researcher in Atlanta at Emory University's Yerkes Primate Center for twelve years. She was subsequently a professor and researcher at Georgia State University's Departments of Biology and Psychology (also in Atlanta) for 25 years, associated closely with the school's Language Research Center. She then became a professor and researcher at University of Iowa and its Iowa Primate Learning Sanctuary in 2005 and at Simpson College.

Research

Savage-Rumbaugh was the first scientist to conduct language research with bonobos.

At the Georgia State University's Language Research Center, Savage-Rumbaugh helped pioneer the use of a number of new technologies for working with primates. These include a keyboard which provides for speech synthesis, allowing the animals to communicate using spoken English, and a "primate friendly" computer-based joystick terminal that permits the automated presentation of many different computerized tasks. Information developed at the center regarding the abilities of non-human primates to acquire symbols, comprehend spoken words, decode simple syntactical structures, learn concepts of number and quantity, and perform complex perceptual-motor tasks has helped change the way humans view other members of the primate order.

Savage-Rumbaugh's work with Kanzi, the first ape to spontaneously acquire words in the same manner as children, was detailed in Language Comprehension in Ape and Child published in Monographs of the Society for Research in Child Development (1993). It was selected by the "Millennium Project" as one of the top 100 most influential works in cognitive science in the 20th century by the University of Minnesota Center for Cognitive Sciences in 1991.

Her view of language – that it is not confined to humans and is learnable by other ape species – is generally criticized and not accepted by researchers from linguistics, psychology and other sciences of the brain and mind. For example, the cognitive scientist Steven Pinker strongly criticized the position of Savage-Rumbaugh and others in his award-winning The Language Instinct, arguing that Kanzi and other non-human primates failed to grasp the fundamentals of language.

According to Alexander Fiske-Harrison, who visited Savage-Rumbaugh in 2001 for the Financial Times, her methods differ from the more clinical techniques of other researchers such as Frans de Waal by taking a "holistic approach to the research, rearing the apes from birth and immersing them in a "linguistic world"."

According to Terrace et al (1979) in their analysis titled "Can An Ape Create a Sentence", apes do not create sentences. They do not move on from the phase of imitation nor begin to create sentences by adding complexity as the mean sentence length increases. When analyzed, creative combinations that appear meaningful can be explained by simpler nonlinguistic properties. Further examination by Thompson and Church "An Explanation of the Language of a Chimpanzee" (1980) point to pair-associative learning followed by reinforcement as an explanation for sentence-like productions.

In September 2012, Savage-Rumbaugh was placed on leave after a group of 12 former employees alleged that she had mistreated the bonobos in her care.  However, Savage-Rumbaugh was reinstated in November of that year. Savage-Rumbaugh later left the Iowa Primate Learning Sanctuary and relocated to New Jersey, embroiled in several legal battles with the Ape Cognition and Conservation Initiative (the successor to the Primate Learning Sanctuary).

Honors and awards

Savage-Rumbaugh received the Leighton A. Wilkie Award in Anthropology from Indiana University in 2000. In 2011, she was recognized as one of Time magazine's 100 Most Influential People in the World.

Savage-Rumbaugh has been awarded honorary Ph.D.s by the University of Chicago in 1997 and Missouri State University in 2008.

Personal life

Savage-Rumbaugh has resided in Missouri; Atlanta, Georgia; Iowa; and New Jersey. From 1976 to 2000, she was married to Dr. Duane Rumbaugh who was also a primate research scientist at Yerkes Primate Center and at the Language Resource Center of Georgia State University, where he was chair of the Psychology Department. She has a son, Shane, whom Rumbaugh adopted.

Bibliography
 
 Savage-Rumbaugh, E.S. 1986. Ape Language: From Conditioned Response to Symbol. New York: Columbia University Press. ASIN B000OQ1WIY
 Savage-Rumbaugh, E.S., and Roger Lewin. 1996. Kanzi: The Ape at the Brink of the Human Mind. Wiley. 
 Savage-Rumbaugh, E.S., Stuart G. Shanker, and Talbot J. Taylor. 2001. Apes, Language, and the Human Mind. Oxford. 
   Lyn, H., Greenfield, P. M., Savage-Rumbaugh, S., Gillespie-Lynch, K., & Hopkins, W. D. (2011). Nonhuman primates do declare! A comparison of declarative symbol and gesture use in two children, two bonobos, and a chimpanzee. Language and Communication, 31, 63-74. 
   Rumbaugh, Duane M., E. Sue Savage-Rumbaugh, James E. King and Jared P. Taglialatela. "The Foundations of Primate Intelligence and Language", The Human Brain Evolving: Paleoneurological Studies in Honor of Ralph L. Holloway, Stone Age Institute Press (2011).
    Gillespie-Lynch, K., Greenfield, P. M., Lyn, H., & Savage-Rumbaugh, S. (in press). The role of dialogue in the ontogeny and phylogeny of early word combinations. First Language.
    Savage-Rumbaugh, S. (2010) "Human Language-Human Consciousness", On the Human, National Humanities Center
    Savage-Rumbaugh, E.S., Rumbaugh, D.M., & Fields, W.M. (2009) "Empirical Kanzi: The ape language debate revisited". The Skeptic.
    Lyn, H., Franks, B., and Savage-Rumbaugh, E. S. (2008) "Precursors of morality in the use of the symbols 'good' and 'bad' in two bonobos (Pan paniscus) and a chimpanzee (Pan troglodytes)". Language and Communication 28(3) 213-224 .
   Greenfield, P. M., Lyn, H., & Savage-Rumbaugh, E. S. (2008). "Protolanguage in ontogeny and phylogeny: combining deixis and representation". Interaction Studies, 9(1), 34-50.
    Rumbaugh, D. M., Washburn, D. A., King, J. E., Beran, M. J. Gould, K., & Savage-Rumbaugh, E. S. (2008). "Why some apes imitate and/or emulate observed behavior and others do not: Fact, theory, and implications for our kind". Journal of Cognitive Education and Psychology, 7, (1), 101 -110.
    Savage-Rumbaugh, S. & Fields, W.M. (2007) "Rules and Tools: Beyond Anthropomorphism: A qualitative report on the stone tool manufacture and use by captive bonobos Kanzi and Panbanisha".In N. Toth's Craft Institute Oldowan Technologies 1(1).
    Fields, W.M., Segerdahl, P., & Savage-Rumbaugh, E.S. (2007) "The Material Practices of Ape Language." In J. Valsiner & Alberto Rosa (eds.) The Cambridge Handbook of Socio-Cultural Psychology, Cambridge: Cambridge University Press.
    Rumbaugh, D. M., E. S. Savage-Rumbaugh, & Taglialatela, J. (2007).  (L. Squire, ed.) "Language Nonhuman Animals".  The New Encyclopedia of Neuroscience.  New York:  Elsevier.
   Savage-Rumbaugh, S., Rumbaugh, D.M. & W.M. Fields. (2006) "Language as a Window on the Cultural Mind." In S. Hurley (Ed.) Rational Animals, Oxford: Oxford University Press.
    Lyn, H., Greenfield, P. G., and Savage-Rumbaugh, E. S. (2006) "The development of pretend play in chimpanzees and bonobos: evolutionary implications, pretense, and the role of interspecies communication", Cognitive Development, 21, 199-213.
    Sue Savage-Rumbaugh, Kanzi Wamba, Panbanisha Wamba and Nyota Wamba. (2007) "Welfare of Apes in Captive Environments: Comments On, and By, a Specific Group of Apes." Journal of Applied Animal Welfare Science.
    Savage-Rumbaugh, S., Fields, W.M., Segerdahl, P., & D.M. Rumbaugh. (2005) "Culture Prefigures Cognition in Pan/Homo Bonobos."Theoria 20(3).
    Savage-Rumbaugh, E.S., Segerdahl, P., Fields, W.M. (2005) "Individual Differences in Language Competencies in Apes Resulting from Unique Rearing Conditions Imposed by Different First Epistemologies." in L.L. Namy & S.R. Waxman (Eds.)
    Segerdahl, P., Fields, W.M., & Savage-Rumbaugh, E.S. (2005) Kanzi's Primal Language: The Cultural Initiation of Apes Into Language. London: Palgrave/Macmillan.
    Savage-Rumbaugh, S., Fields, W.M., & T. Spircu. (2004). The Emergence of Knapping and Vocal Expression Embedded in a Pan/Homo Culture. Journal of Biology and Philosophy (19).
    Fields, W.M., & Savage-Rumbaugh, S. (2003). [Review of the book A Mind So Rare: The Evolution of Human Consciousness]. Contemporary Psychology 48(8).
    Savage-Rumbaugh, S., Fields, W. (2002) "Hacias el control de nuevas realidades," Quark (25), 20-26.
    Savage-Rumbaugh, S., Fields, W.M. & Taglialetela, J. (2001) "Language, Speech, Tools and Writing: A cultural imperative." In Thompson, E. (Ed.), Between Ourselves: Second-person issues in the study of consciousness, (pp. 273–292) Exeter, UK: Imprint Academic.
    Savage-Rumbuagh, E.S. & Fields, W.M. (2000) "Linguistic, Cultural and Cognitive Capabilities of Bonobos (Pan paniscus)." Culture & Psychology 6(2), 131-153.
    "Perception of Personality Traits and Semantic Learning in Evolving Hominids." The Descent of Mind: Psychological Perspectives on Hominid Evolution (pp. 98–115), Oxford University Press, 1999.
    "Ape Communication: Between a Rock and a Hard Place." Origins of Language: What Non-Human Primates Can Tell Us, School of American Research Press, 1999.
    "Continuing Investigations into the Stone Tool-Making and Tool-Using Capabilities of Bonobo (Pan paniscus)" in Journal of Archaeological Science, 26 (pages 821-832), 1999.
    "Language, Comprehension in Ape and Child" (Monographs of the Society for Research in Child Development) Sue Savage-Rumbaugh, Jeannine Murphy, Rose A. Sevcik, Karen E. Brakke, Shelly L. Williams and Duane M. Rumbaugh; University Of Chicago Press (July 1993)

References

External links

"Apes that write, start fires and play Pac-Man", Savage-Rumbaugh's TED talk
Interview with Sue Savage-Rumbaugh, The Paula Gordon Show
Sue Savage-Rumbaugh at My Hero Project

Women primatologists
Primatologists
Ape Cognition and Conservation Initiative
Georgia State University faculty
University of Oklahoma alumni
1946 births
Living people
American mammalogists
American women psychologists
21st-century American psychologists
21st-century American women
20th-century American psychologists